Megan Amram (born September 3, 1987) is an American comedy writer, producer, and performer. She is most known for her work as co-writer and producer for the NBC series The Good Place. Amram created and starred in the comedy web series, An Emmy for Megan, which depicts Amram's quest to win an Emmy.

Early life and education
Amram was born and raised in Portland, Oregon, and is Jewish. She was educated at Catlin Gabel School and Harvard University where she graduated in 2010. While at Harvard, Amram wrote two of the Hasty Pudding Theatricals' comedy drag shows with her roommate and writing partner Alexandra Petri. She studied violin for twenty years, and appeared as a violinist in an October 2018 episode of The Good Place, a sitcom on which she was a staff writer.

Career
Previously, Amram was a writer on the Amazon series Transparent, HBO's Silicon Valley, and the final three seasons of the NBC comedy Parks and Recreation. Her other past credits include writing for Adult Swim's Childrens Hospital, Fox's The Simpsons, Comedy Central's Kroll Show, the 83rd and 90th Academy Awards, the 2012 MTV Movie Awards, the Disney Channel and contributing to Funny Or Die and the Comedy Central Roasts. Her writing has appeared in The New Yorker, McSweeney's, Vulture, Vice Magazine and The Awl, among others, and her first book Science... For Her! was published in November 2015 by Simon & Schuster.

Along with her work as a writer, Amram has occasionally ventured into acting, with a 2011 appearance on RuPaul's Drag U, and on The CW musical comedy series Crazy Ex-Girlfriend in an episode titled "I Need Some Balance" in January 2019.

In 2018, Amram created, directed, wrote, and starred in the comedy web series, An Emmy for Megan, which depicts Amram's quest to win an Emmy Award by meeting the minimum standards to qualify for an Emmy nomination in the Outstanding Actress in a Short Form Comedy or Drama Series category. The first series was nominated for two Emmy Awards, one in the Outstanding Short Form Comedy or Drama Series category and one in the Outstanding Actress in a Short Form Comedy or Drama Series category for Amram. The second series was released in May 2019 and was nominated for two Emmy Awards: one in the Outstanding Actress in a Short Form Comedy or Drama Series category and one, for Patton Oswalt, in the Outstanding Actor in a Short Form Comedy or Drama Series category.

Controversy
In June 2020, tweets resurfaced of Amram making anti-Semitic, homophobic, and anti-Asian American jokes. In one tweet, she wrote "It's not politically correct to say 'retarded' anymore, you have to call them 'Asian-Americans'." In another, she said "If I had a time machine, I'd go back in time and kill Hitler and all of the Jews and gypsies and gay people."

Amram later apologized in a statement saying: "... I am speaking from the heart and trying my best to communicate my sincere regret. I am deeply embarrassed and more apologetic than you can ever know."

Personal life
Amram currently resides in Los Angeles. 
In 2019, Amram joined other WGA writers in firing their agents as part of the WGA's stand against the ATA and the practice of packaging.

Filmography

Television

Awards and nominations

Bibliography

References

External links
 
 

1987 births
Living people
American women comedians
American television writers
Harvard University alumni
American women screenwriters
Catlin Gabel School alumni
The New Yorker people
Comedians from Oregon
Writers from Portland, Oregon
Screenwriters from Oregon
21st-century American comedians
American women television writers
Jewish American writers
21st-century American screenwriters
21st-century American women writers
21st-century American Jews